Pedro Escobedo is a municipality in Querétaro in central Mexico.
The municipal seat is at Pedro Escobedo.

References

Municipalities of Querétaro